Telegiornale, or TG, may refer to:

 TG1, the Italian national newscasts on Rai 1
 TG2, the Italian national newscasts on Rai 2
 TG3, the Italian national newscasts on Rai 3
 TGR, the Italian regional newscasts on Rai 3
 TG4 (news program), the Italian national newscasts on Rete 4
 TG5, the Italian national newscasts on Canale 5
 TG La7, the Italian national newscasts on La7
 Telegiornale nazionale, the Swiss Italian-language national newscasts on La 1
 TGCOM, an Italian news website owned by Mediaset